Nell Rose Hudson (born 19 November 1990) is an English actress best known for her recurring roles as Laoghaire MacKenzie in the Starz television drama Outlander and Nancy Skerrett in the ITV period drama Victoria.

Early life
Hudson was born on 19 November 1990 in a small village in West Midlands, England. She is the daughter of journalist and author Cressida Connolly and Charles Hudson.

The middle of three children, Hudson decided, as a teenager, to pursue acting. Hudson attended the Oxford School of Drama, performing in plays such as The Crucible and Closer, eventually graduating with a degree in acting. Her sister, Violet, is a journalist and writer who has written for The Daily Telegraph, the Spectator and Tatler. Early in her career, Nell Hudson was regularly featured in the Tatler List.

Career
Hudson's first professional role, in 2012, was a guest spot in an episode of the fifteenth series of the BBC One medical drama Holby City. Later that year she appeared in Garrick Hamm's short film Cast Offs and director Bruce Logan's short Les Bohemes. In 2014, she landed the role of Laoghaire MacKenzie in Starz's time travel drama Outlander, based upon Diana Gabaldon's best-selling book series. The character is recurring and will continue throughout the series. On her character during the series' mid-season episode, Hudson stated that "when you are in just a lot of pain, it comes out as anger… I think that's quite a human characteristic, basically, and I think that's definitely what happens is that she's [Laoghaire] got all this pain and she doesn't know what to do with it and it comes out in this very kind of aggressive way and she does whatever she can do to rectify the situation."

Hudson guest-starred as Paulette Roland, a 17-year-old diabetic who discovers that she is pregnant, in series four of the BBC medical period drama Call the Midwife. The episode, which aired on 22 February 2015, explores the character's struggle with the possibility of either a dangerous pregnancy or a legal abortion. That same year she guest starred in NBC's international crime drama Crossing Lines. On 14 May 2015, Hudson played Lydia Bennet in Tamara Harvey's production of Jane Austen's Pride and Prejudice at the Sheffield Crucible, alongside James Northcote and Isabella Laughland.

In 2016, Hudson was featured in a series one episode of Sky1's amateur detective series Agatha Raisin, based upon the book series by MC Beaton. Hudson also appears in ITV's Victoria, a period drama centering on the life of British monarch Queen Victoria. She portrays Nancy Skerrett, the Queen's dresser, in the ongoing series.

BBC's drama Informer (2018), about police informants, sees Hudson in the role of Charlotte Humphreys, an art student and potential love interest to main character Raza.

Music career
Hudson worked briefly as a professional singer-songwriter, headlining at London's famous Ronnie Scott's Jazz Club, as well as touring with Jools Holland. She plays the piano and ukulele.

Writing career
Her debut novel, a story of friendship amid loss titled Just For Today, is slated to be released in early 2022 through Tinder Press.

Personal life 
In 2021, she began a relationship with British film producer Maximillian King.

Filmography

Television

Film

Theatre

Awards and nominations

References

External links

1990 births
Living people
Actresses from Worcestershire
Alumni of the Oxford School of Drama
English film actresses
English television actresses
Actors from Worcester, England
20th-century English actresses
21st-century English actresses